Senator Shoemaker may refer to:

Lazarus Denison Shoemaker (1819–1893), Pennsylvania State Senate
Mike Shoemaker (born 1945), Ohio State Senate
Richard Shoemaker (born 1951), Wisconsin State Senate
John Shumaker (1929–1999), Pennsylvania State Senate